Jewfish is an unincorporated community in Monroe County, Florida, United States.  It is located in the upper Florida Keys on Key Largo off U.S. Route 1 (Overseas Highway).  It is just west of the census-designated place (CDP) of North Key Largo.
  
It has a hotel, restaurant, and marina.

History
A post office called Jewfish was established in 1912, and remained in operation until it was discontinued in 1921. The community took its name from the jewfish, a type of saltwater fish considered a delicacy.

Jewfish is adjacent to Jewfish Creek, an inlet which is spanned by Jewfish Creek Bridge. In 2002, Monroe County commissioners unanimously declined to rename the inlet.

Geography

References

External links
History of Key Largo

Unincorporated communities in Monroe County, Florida
Unincorporated communities in Florida